The Kid or The Kids may refer to:

Fictional characters
 The kid (Blood Meridian), a character in Cormac McCarthy's 1985 novel Blood Meridian
 The Kid (The Matrix), a character in the Matrix film series
 The Kid (The Stand), a character in Stephen King's 1978 novel The Stand
 Marshall Eriksen or The Kid, a character in How I Met Your Mother
 The Kid, a character in the 1984 film Purple Rain, played by Prince
 The Kid, the narrator of Samuel R. Delany's 1975 novel Dhalgren
 The Kid, a character in Bastion
 The Kid, a character in Driver: Parallel Lines
 The Kid, a character in Freedom Fighters
 The Kid, a character in I Wanna Be the Guy
 The Kid, a character in Jak II

Films
 The Kid (1910 film), a film by Frank Powell
 The Kid (1921 film), a Charlie Chaplin film
 The Kid (1950 film), a Hong Kong film that stars a young Bruce Lee
 The Kid (1997 film), a film  featuring Rod Steiger
 The Kid (1999 film), a Hong Kong film
 Disney's The Kid, a 2000 film starring Bruce Willis
 The Kid (2001 film), an animated TV film based on a story by Gahan Wilson
 The Kid (2010 film), an adaptation by Nick Moran of Kevin Lewis's book 
 The Kids (film), a 2015 Taiwanese film
 The Kid (2019 film), a film by Vincent D'Onofrio

Music
 The Kid (musical), a 2010 musical based on the book by Dan Savage
 The Kids (Belgian band), a punk rock band
 The Kids (Norwegian band), a rock band
 The Kids (garage rock band), a 1960s band whose song "Nature's Children" is included on the compilation album Pebbles, Volume 10
 The Kids, a South Florida rock band that included Johnny Depp
 "The Kids", a song by B.o.B from B.o.B Presents: The Adventures of Bobby Ray
 "The Kid", a song by Eric Burdon from Survivor
 "The Kids", a song by Eminem from The Marshall Mathers LP
 "The Kids", a song by Hollywood Undead
 "The Kids", a song by Lou Reed from Berlin

Nickname or ring name
 Frank Bourne (1854–1945), British soldier, last known survivor of the Battle of Rorke's Drift
 Billy the Kid (1859–1881), American Old West outlaw
 Ted Williams (1918–2002), Major League Baseball player
 Stu Ungar (1953–1998), professional poker and gin rummy player
 Gary Carter (1954-2012), Major League Baseball player
 Robin Yount (born 1955), Major League Baseball player
 Mark Ryan (guitarist) (1959-2011), English punk rock guitarist and playwright
 Carlos Valderrama (footballer) (born 1961), Colombian footballer
 Gary Jacobs (boxer) (born 1965), professional Scottish boxer
 Ken Griffey Jr. (born 1969), American retired Major League Baseball player
 Sean Waltman (born 1972), professional wrestler
 John Higgins (born 1975), professional snooker player
 Kevin Garnett (born 1976), National Basketball Association player
 Julian Gardner (poker player) (born 1978), professional poker player
 Yossi Benayoun (born 1980), Israeli footballer
 Kerby Raymundo (born 1981), Filipino professional basketball player
 Fernando Torres (born 1984), Spanish footballer
 Sidney Crosby (born 1987), National Hockey League player
 Joseph Marquez (born 1991), professional Super Smash Bros. Melee player

Other uses 
 The Kid (artist), contemporary artist
 The Kid (book), a book by Dan Savage
 The Kids (book), a 2021 poetry book by Hannah Lowe, Costa Book of the Year
 Haedi or the Kids, a pair of stars in the constellation Auriga

See also
 Kid (disambiguation)
 Kidd (disambiguation)
 Kydd (disambiguation)
 

Kid